Jason Raymond Cannon (born December 16, 1980), better known as  Young Shanty, is an American reggae and dancehall musician. His album Chalice Row or Dig a Hole debut at the number one spot and spent three weeks on Billboard's reggae albums charts.

Music career

Early Years
Cannon began his career as the lead singer in a band called STARLINER. Together they released an album in 2007 dubbed Lion Fyah. After this venture he embarked on a solo career using the stage name Ras Iyahson and proceeded to release an album called "More Hot” in June 2009.

Ras Iyahson to Young Shanty
In 2012 Cannon changed his name to Young Shanty and embarked on the third phase of his career. In 2016,  he released an EP titled "Chalice Row Or Dig A Hole".  In 2017,  Young Shanty released a single called "More Weed" which featured Sizzla and Ras Rap. He has appeared on shows in Hawaii, Canada as well as several performances on the West Coast of the United States.  
Young Shanty shared stages with artists such as: Dead Prez, Wu-Tang Clan, Cappadonna, Killah Priest, Kymani Marley, Beenie Man, Inner Circle (band) and Half Pint to name a few.

Billboard Debut
On April 12, 2017. Young Shanty’s EP Chalice Row or Dig a Hole debut at number 1 and spent 3 weeks on Billboard's reggae albums charts. This EP was produced by Giddimani Records. It had seven tracks with features from Perfect Giddimani, Teflon and Jahdan Blakkamoore. In August 2016, "Chalice Row or Dig a Hole" was released on compact disc as a combined effort between Chalice Row Unlimited and Giddimani Records.

Discography

Album

Singles

Various Artists Compilations

References

1980 births
Living people
Dancehall musicians
Performers of Rastafarian music
21st-century American singers
21st-century American male singers